Giuseppe Aquari (1 January 1916 –  30 December 1982) was an Italian film cinematographer.

Life and career 
Born in Rome into a noble family, Aquari studied as an engineer and then enrolled at the Centro Sperimentale di Cinematografia, graduating as an operator. He began his film career in 1942, working as an operator in Luigi Chiarini's La locandiera. After several years in which Aquari worked mainly for documentaries, in 1952 he made his debut as a cinematographer in the melodrama film Ultimo perdono. From then he worked in dozens of films as well as in commercials and art documentaries. He died on 30 December 1982, shortly before undergoing a major surgery.

Selected filmography   
 The Cliff of Sin (1950)
 Final Pardon (1952)
 Love and Troubles (1958)
 The Hunchback of Rome (1960) 
 Le ambiziose (1961)
 Congo vivo (1962)
 The Changing of the Guard (1962)
 Terror in the Crypt (1964)
 Te lo leggo negli occhi (1965)
 An Angel for Satan (1966)
 For a Few Dollars Less (1966)
 Kill the Wicked! (1967)
 Something Creeping in The Dark (1971)
 The Profiteer (1974)
 The Killer Reserved Nine Seats (1974)
 Frankenstein - Italian Style  (1975)
 Malía (1975)
 Stato interessante (1977)
 The Roses of Danzig (1979)
 Terror Express (1979)
 Il paramedico (1982)

References

External links 
 

 

1916 births
1982 deaths
Film people from Rome
Italian cinematographers
Centro Sperimentale di Cinematografia alumni